Kalev Kotkas (born 10 April 1960 in Tallinn) is an Estonian politician. He has been member of IX, XI, XII and XIII Riigikogu.

In 1983 he graduated from Tallinn University of Technology in mechanical engineering and machine tools.

From 1996 to 1999 and 2005 to 2007 he was the mayor of Emmaste Rural Municipality.

From 2007 he is a member of Estonian Social Democratic Party.

References

1960 births
Living people
Social Democratic Party (Estonia) politicians
Members of the Riigikogu, 1999–2003
Members of the Riigikogu, 2007–2011
Members of the Riigikogu, 2011–2015
Tallinn University of Technology alumni
Politicians from Tallinn
Members of the Riigikogu, 2015–2019